Pak Chol-ryong (born 3 November 1988) is a North Korean football player.

Between 2008–10 he played for FC Concordia Basel.

Club career statistics

References

External links
 football.ch profile 
 

Living people
North Korean footballers
North Korea international footballers
North Korean expatriate sportspeople in Switzerland
FC Concordia Basel players
1988 births
Association football midfielders